In mathematics, a semifield is an algebraic structure with two binary operations, addition and multiplication, which is similar to a field, but with some axioms relaxed.

Overview
The term semifield has two conflicting meanings, both of which include fields as a special case.

 In projective geometry and finite geometry (MSC 51A, 51E, 12K10), a semifield is a nonassociative division ring with multiplicative identity element.  More precisely, it is a nonassociative ring whose nonzero elements form a loop under multiplication. In other words, a semifield is a set S with two operations + (addition) and · (multiplication), such that 
 (S,+) is an abelian group,
 multiplication is distributive on both the left and right, 
 there exists a multiplicative identity element, and 
 division is always possible: for every a and every nonzero b in S, there exist unique x and y in S for which b·x = a and y·b = a. 
 Note in particular that the multiplication is not assumed to be commutative or associative. A semifield that is associative is a division ring, and one that is both associative and commutative is a field. A semifield by this definition is a special case of a quasifield. If S is finite, the last axiom in the definition above can be replaced with the assumption that there are no zero divisors, so that a·b = 0 implies that a = 0 or b = 0. Note that due to the lack of associativity, the last axiom is not equivalent to the assumption that every nonzero element has a multiplicative inverse, as is usually found in definitions of fields and division rings.

 In ring theory, combinatorics, functional analysis, and theoretical computer science (MSC 16Y60), a semifield is a semiring (S,+,·) in which all nonzero elements have a multiplicative inverse. These objects are also called proper semifields. A variation of this definition arises if S contains an absorbing zero that is different from the multiplicative unit e, it is required that the non-zero elements be invertible, and a·0 = 0·a = 0. Since multiplication is associative, the (non-zero) elements of a semifield form a group. However, the pair (S,+) is only a semigroup, i.e. additive inverse need not exist, or, colloquially, 'there is no subtraction'. Sometimes, it is not assumed that the multiplication is associative.

Primitivity of semifields
A semifield D is called right (resp. left) primitive if it has an element w such that the set of nonzero elements of D* is equal to the set of all right (resp. left) principal powers of w.

Examples 
We only give examples of semifields in the second sense, i.e. additive semigroups with distributive multiplication. Moreover, addition is commutative and multiplication is associative in our examples.

 Positive rational numbers with the usual addition and multiplication form a commutative semifield.
This can be extended by an absorbing 0. 
 Positive real numbers with the usual addition and multiplication form a commutative semifield.
This can be extended by an absorbing 0, forming the probability semiring, which is isomorphic to the log semiring.
 Rational functions of the form f /g, where f and g are polynomials in one variable with positive coefficients, form a commutative semifield.
This can be extended to include 0.
 The real numbers R can be viewed a semifield where the sum of two elements is defined to be their maximum and the product to be their ordinary sum; this semifield is more compactly denoted (R, max, +).  Similarly (R, min, +) is a semifield. These are called the tropical semiring.
This can be extended by −∞ (an absorbing 0); this is the limit (tropicalization) of the log semiring as the base goes to infinity.
 Generalizing the previous example, if (A,·,≤) is a lattice-ordered group then (A,+,·) is an additively idempotent semifield with the semifield sum defined to be the supremum of two elements. Conversely, any additively idempotent semifield (A,+,·) defines a lattice-ordered group (A,·,≤), where a≤b if and only if a + b = b.
 The boolean semifield B = {0, 1} with addition defined by logical or, and multiplication defined by logical and.

See also

 Planar ternary ring (first sense)

References 

Algebraic structures
Ring theory